Dejan Popović (born 1950 in Belgrade) is a Serbian professor of law and the former rector of Belgrade University between 2004 and 2006. In 2008 he was appointed Ambassador of Serbia to the United Kingdom.

Popović graduated from the University of Belgrade's Law School in 1973. He obtained his master's degree in 1976 and PhD in 1980. Since 1991 he has been a professor of law, teaching public finances and finance law.

He has written 13 books and numerous academic articles.

In the Government of Serbia (2001-2004) he was the Deputy Minister of Finance. He is not a member of any political party.

External links
 Official site of the University of Belgrade, Faculty of Law, Professor Popović

1950 births
Living people
Diplomats from Belgrade
Ambassadors of Serbia to the United Kingdom
Lawyers from Belgrade
University of Belgrade Faculty of Law alumni
Academic staff of the University of Belgrade
Rectors of the University of Belgrade
20th-century Serbian lawyers
Yugoslav lawyers